In finance, a trust certificate is a corporate bond backed by other securities, usually a parent corporation borrowing against securities of its subsidiaries.

References

Bonds (finance)
Securities (finance)